Jenni Anna Christina Asserholt (born 8 April 1988) is a Swedish retired ice hockey player and current team physical therapist to HV71 Dam of the Swedish Women's Hockey League (SDHL). She played as a forward with HV71 Dam and Linköping HC Dam in the SDHL and with the Swedish women's national ice hockey team. She won a silver medal at the 2006 Winter Olympics.

In 2004 Jenni underwent treatment for her asthma, even though she doesn't experience any asthmatic symptoms as of 2011. She has said that the cold temperatures in ice hockey rinks cause breathing difficulties during her younger years.

References

External links
 
 

1988 births
Living people
Sportspeople from Örebro
Swedish women's ice hockey forwards
Minnesota Duluth Bulldogs women's ice hockey players
HV71 Dam players
Linköping HC Dam players
Ice hockey players at the 2006 Winter Olympics
Ice hockey players at the 2010 Winter Olympics
Ice hockey players at the 2014 Winter Olympics
Medalists at the 2006 Winter Olympics
Olympic ice hockey players of Sweden
Olympic medalists in ice hockey
Olympic silver medalists for Sweden